The Hockenhorn is a mountain of the Bernese Alps, located on the border between the Swiss cantons of Bern and Valais. Its summit is 3,293 metres high and lies between the upper Kandertal and the Lötschental. On its southern (Valais) side lies a glacier named Milibachgletscher.

The summit of the Hockenhorn is accessible by a trail starting at the Lötschen Pass. The southern side of the mountain is part of a ski area. The closest locality is Lauchernalp above Kippel.

References

External links

 Hockenhorn on Hikr

Mountains of the Alps
Alpine three-thousanders
Mountains of Switzerland
Mountains of Valais
Mountains of the canton of Bern
Bern–Valais border
Bernese Alps